The Canadian Champion Older Male Horse is a  Canadian Thoroughbred horse racing honour. Created in 1975 by the Jockey Club of Canada, it is part of the Sovereign Awards program and is awarded annually to the top horse four years or older competing in Canada. The award was renamed to Champion Older Main Track Male before the 2019 Sovereign Awards.

Past winners

2020 : Skywire
2019 : Pink Lloyd
2018 : Mr Havercamp
2017 : Pink Lloyd
2016 : Are You Kidding Me
2015 : Are You Kidding Me
2014 : Lukes Alley
2013 : Alpha Bettor
2012 : Hunters Bay
2011 : Fifty Proof
2010 : Sand Cove
2009 : Marchfield
2008 : Marchfield
2007 : True Metropolitan
2006 : True Metropolitan
2005 : A Bit O'Gold
2004 : Mobil
2003 : Phantom Light
2002 : Wake at Noon
2001 : A Fleets Dancer
2000 : One Way Love
1999 : Deputy Inxs
1998 : Terremoto
1997 : Chief Bearhart
1996 : Mt. Sassafras
1995 : Basqueian
1994 : King Ruckus
1993 : Cozzene's Prince
1992 : Rainbows For Life
1991 : Sky Classic
1990 : Twist the Snow
1989 : Steady Power
1988 : Play the King
1987 : Play the King
1986 : Let's Go Blue
1985 : Ten Gold Pots
1984 : Canadian Factor
1983 : Travelling Victor
1982 : Frost King
1981 : Driving Home
1980 : Overskate
1979 : Overskate
1978 : Giboulee
1977 : Norcliffe
1976 : Victorian Prince
1975 : Rash Move

References

External links
The Sovereign Awards at the Jockey Club of Canada website

Sovereign Award winners
Horse racing awards
Horse racing in Canada